Taifour Diané (born 1 November 1972) is a Guinean former footballer and the manager of 1. FC Saarbrücken's women's team.

Career
Diané was born in Kankan, Guinea.

In 1992, Diané signed with the Colorado Foxes of the American Professional Soccer League.  He was the league MVP, Rookie of the Year, first team All League and the league's second leading scorer.  That season, the Foxes won the league championship. He continued with the Foxes in 1993.

Personal life
He also holds German citizenship.

References

External links
 
 Taifour Diané at Sport.de

Living people
1972 births
People from Kankan
Association football forwards
Guinean footballers
Guinean expatriate footballers
Guinea international footballers
1998 African Cup of Nations players
Horoya AC players
Colorado Foxes players
Bayer 04 Leverkusen players
Bayer 04 Leverkusen II players
Borussia Mönchengladbach players
FC 08 Homburg players
1. FC Saarbrücken players
Alemannia Aachen players
SV Elversberg players
Borussia Neunkirchen players
Expatriate soccer players in the United States
Guinean expatriate sportspeople in the United States
American Professional Soccer League players
Bundesliga players
2. Bundesliga players
FC 08 Homburg managers
Guinean football managers